A taifa was a small Islamic principality in Spain or Sicily.

Taifa may also refer to:

 Taifa, Accra, in Ghana
 Taifa, Morocco, in Taza Province